The Portico of Glory (Spanish: El pórtico de la gloria) is a 1953 Spanish drama film directed by Rafael J. Salvia and starring José Mojica, Lina Rosales and Santiago Rivero.

Cast

References

Bibliography 
 José Luis Castro de Paz & Josetxo Cerdán. Suevia Films-Cesáreo González: treinta años de cine español. Xunta de Galicia, 2005.

External links 
 

1953 drama films
Spanish drama films
1953 films
1950s Spanish-language films
Suevia Films films
Films directed by Rafael J. Salvia
Films scored by Juan Quintero Muñoz
Films with screenplays by Rafael J. Salvia
Spanish black-and-white films
1950s Spanish films